Antique is a 2008 South Korean comedy–thriller film, starring Ju Ji-hoon, Kim Jae-wook, Yoo Ah-in, and Choi Ji-ho. It is based on the comic Antique Bakery by Fumi Yoshinaga. It was released in cinemas in South Korea on November 13, 2008.

It was invited to the 59th Berlin International Film Festival. It was released on DVD in the UK on February 11, 2013, as Antique Bakery, though its official English title in South Korea, and which it was promoted as at festivals internationally, is just Antique. As of March 2021, it has not been widely released in Northern America or Australia.

Plot
As an heir to the family fortune, Jin-hyuk has money, the looks, the charm, everything except finding the love of his life. So he sets up a cake shop where women are sure to come. He hires Sun-woo, a talented patissier who had a crush on Jin-hyuk back in high school. Along with an ex-boxing champion Gi-beom and a clueless bodyguard Su-young, the four unique and handsome young men stir up the quiet neighborhood at their cake shop, Antique. Although seemingly careless and happy, each of the four men have unforgettable pasts that they are afraid to face, but their secrets slowly begin to unravel.

Cast
 Ju Ji-hoon as Kim Jin-hyeok – "Antique" bakery owner
 Kim Jae-wook as Min Seon-woo – gay genius pâtissier
 Yoo Ah-in as  Yang Ki-beom – boxing champion turned apprentice
 Choi Ji-ho as Nam Soo-yeong – bodyguard
 Andy Gillet as Jean-Baptise Evan
 Ko Chang-seok as gay club master
 Yeo Jin-goo as young Jin-hyeok
 Kim Jung-heon as Pretty worker
 Kim Min-sun as Jin-hyeok's girlfriend (cameo)
 Lee Young-jin as Jin-hyeok's girlfriend (cameo)
 Seo Young-hee as Jin-hyeok's girlfriend (cameo)

Reception
The film opened third at the box office grossing $1,495,183. The second weekend it rose up to the second place grossing $909,629. The film ended its run grossing $5,608,515 with 1,192,456 tickets sold nationwide. The film drew more than one million moviegoers within the first two weeks of its release.

Awards and nominations

References

External links
 
 
 

2008 films
Films directed by Min Kyu-dong
2000s French-language films
Gay-related films
2000s Korean-language films
Live-action films based on manga
South Korean drama films
South Korean LGBT-related films
South Korean multilingual films
2008 multilingual films
2008 LGBT-related films
2000s South Korean films